Ishita Panchal (born 1 December 1998) is an Indian film and television actress. She is known for playing the lead role of Roma in Bollywood horror film Bhoot and Friends (2010).

Panchal started her career with the role of young Tapasya in Colors TV's popular and successful show Uttaran. She then appeared in the movie Ek Vivaah Aisa Bhi. 

She is the only child of her parents, who are doctors.

Filmography

Films

Television

References

External links
 
 

1998 births
Living people
Indian child actresses
Indian television actresses